Dotsiko is a village and a former community in Grevena regional unit, West Macedonia, Greece. Since the 2011 local government reform it is part of the municipality Grevena, of which it is a municipal unit. The village had 39 inhabitants in 2011. The municipal unit has an area of 30.265 km2.

References

External links
 Educational Club of Dotsiko

Populated places in Grevena (regional unit)
Former municipalities in Western Macedonia